Globe Station may refer to:

Globe station, a light rail station in Sacramento, California, USA
Globe Hill Station, a defunct pastoral lease and cattle station in Western Australia
Globe Ranger Station, a principal office in the Tonto National Forest in Arizona, USA
Globe Road & Devonshire Street railway station, a demolished railway station in London, England